Tadhamon  Bank is a Yemeni Stock Company that offers banking and integrative investing services and activities locally and internationally that abide by Islamic Banking Standards.

History
Tadhamon Bank is considered one of the largest, classic banks in Yemen. It was founded in 1996 based on the Islamic Banks Law in the republic of Yemen. 
TIIB was established initially under the name of Yemen Islamic Bank for Investment and Development and was later renamed to TIIB (Tadhamon international Islamic Bank) to reflect its business expansion ambitions.

In 2008, the bank was rated the most efficient Islamic bank in a low-income country, and by 2009 it had become the second largest Islamic financial institution by assets in the MENA region.

Currently, the bank runs assets that are estimated at 497 billion YR which is approximately $2.314 billion US dollars. Its fixed capital is 20 billion Rials which is $93 million US dollars.

Location
Tadhamon International Islamic Bank is located in Sana'a, Republic of Yemen. It consists of 24 branches spread over most of Yemeni governorates and more than 120 ATM machines.

References

Banks of Yemen